Lac de Chanon is a lake at Martigna in the Jura department of France.

Chanon